Sri Lanka is a tropical island situated close to the southern tip of India. The invertebrate fauna is as large as it is common to other regions of the world. There are about 2 million species of arthropods found in the world, and still it is counting. So many new species are discover up to this time also. So it is very complicated and difficult to summarize the exact number of species found within a certain region.

The following list provide the aphid fauna of Sri Lanka.

Aphids

Phylum: Arthropoda   Class: Insecta
Order: Hemiptera
Superfamily: Aphidoidea

Aphids are minute insects that are plant sap feeders.  They affect largely to economically valuable plants greatly, so aphids are of economic importance. About 4500 species with 500 genera are described in aphids. Out of them, Sri Lanka comprises 74 species in 46 genera and 6 subfamilies. 2 endemic aphid species found on Sri Lanka.

Family Aphididae 
Subfamily: Aphidinae
 
 Acyrthosiphon gossypii
 Acyrthosiphon kondoi
 Acyrthosiphon pisum
 Akkaia taiwana
 Aphis craccivora
 Aphis fabae - ssp.solanella
 Aphis gossypii
 Aphis nasturtii
 Aphis nerii
 Aphis spiraecola
 Neomyzus circumflexus = Aulacorthum circumflexus
 Aulacorthum solani
 Brachycaudus helichrysi
 Chaetosiphon tetrarhodum
 Dysaphis crataegi
 Hyalopterus pruni
 Hysteroneura setariae
 Ipuka dispersum
 Lipaphis erysimi
 Macrosiphoniella sanborni
 Macrosiphoniella pseudoartemisiae
 Macrosiphum euphorbiae
 Macrosiphum rosae
 Matsumuraja capitophoroides - endemic
 Melanaphis sacchari
 Micromyzus judenkoi
 Micromyzus kalimpongensis
 Micromyzus niger
 Myzus ascalonicus
 Myzus boehmeriae
 Myzus cerasi
 Myzus obtusirostris
 Myzus ornatus
 Myzus persicae
 Neotoxoptera oliveri
 Pentalonia nigronervosa
 Phorodon humuli
 Rhopalosiphum maidis
 Rhodobium porosum
 Rhopalosiphoninus latysiphon
 Rhopalosiphum padi
 Rhopalosiphum rufiabdominale
 Schizaphis rotundiventris
 Schizaphis graminum
 Schizaphis hypersiphonata
 Schizaphis minuta
 Sinomegoura citricola
 Sitobion avenae
 Sitobion lambersi
 Sitobion leelamaniae
 Sitobion miscanthi
 Sitobion pauliani
 Sitobion phyllanthi
 Sitobion wikstroemiae
 Toxoptera aurantii
 Toxoptera citricida
 Toxoptera odinae
 Uroleucon minutum
 Vesiculaphis caricis

Subfamily: Drepanosiphinae
 Shivaphis celti
 Tinocallis kahawaluokalani

Subfamily: Greenideinae
 Greenidea artocarpi
 Greenidea formosana
 Greenideoida ceyloniae
 Schoutedenia lutea

Subfamily: Hormaphidinae
 Astegopteryx bambusae
 Astegopteryx insularis
 Astegopteryx minuta
 Cerataphis brasiliensis
 Ceratoglyphina bambusae
 Ceratovacuna lanigera
 Pseudoregma bambucicola

Subfamily: Lachninae - Giant aphids
 Ceratopemphigus zehntneri - endemic
 Eriosoma lanigerum
 Geoica lucifuga
 Kaltenbachiella elsholtriae
 Kaltenbachiella japonica
 Tetraneura nigriabdominalis
 Tetraneura yezoensis

External links
 http://dl.nsf.ac.lk/bitstream/handle/1/7765/CJS(B.S)-23(1)-25.pdf;jsessionid=2FE9EAA88AD2078D2A162AA717162100?sequence=2
 http://slendemics.net/easl/invertibrates/aphids/aphids.html

L
 
Aphids
Sri Lanka